Mats Johansson (born 26 January 1971) is a Swedish freestyle skier. He competed in the men's aerials event at the 1994 Winter Olympics.

References

External links
 

1971 births
Living people
Swedish male freestyle skiers
Olympic freestyle skiers of Sweden
Freestyle skiers at the 1994 Winter Olympics
People from Norberg
Sportspeople from Västmanland County
20th-century Swedish people